XX Persei (IRC +50052 / HIP 9582 / BD+54°444) is a semiregular variable red supergiant star in the constellation Perseus, between the Double Cluster and the border with Andromeda.

Variability

XX Persei is a semiregular variable star of sub-type SRc, indicating a cool supergiant.  The General Catalogue of Variable Stars gives the period as 415 days. It also shows a long secondary period which was originally given at 4,100 days. A more recent study shows only slow variations with a period of 3,150 ± 1,000 days.  Another study failed to find any long period up to 10,000 days.

Distance

Characteristics
XX Per is a red supergiant of spectral type M4Ib with an effective temperature below 4,000 K. It has a large infrared excess, indicating surrounding dust at a temperature of 900 K, but no masers have been detected.

XX Persei has a mass of 16 solar masses, above the limit beyond which stars end their lives as supernovae.

Companions
This star is BD+54°445 and it is an unrelated foreground object. In addition, the spectrum of XX Persei shows absorption lines of a hot companion too close to be resolved. The combined spectral type has been given as M4Ib + B7V, while the UV spectrum of the companion has been used to derive a spectral classification of A.

See also
 RS Persei
 S Persei

References

Semiregular variable stars
Perseus (constellation)
009582
M-type supergiants
BD+54 444
J02030935+5513566
Perseus, XX
012401